Puerto Rico Highway 204 (PR-204) was previously a short connector road between PR-22 and PR-2 in Barceloneta, Puerto Rico but was renumbered Puerto Rico Highway 140, and a new PR-204 was built in Las Piedras, Puerto Rico, which connects PR-30 and PR-198 to PR-183 in the municipality. The new connector was constructed to better serve residents of the town which can only enter through the exit to PR-183 and has a high frequency of long congestion and traffic jams. The main movie theater in the east coast can be accessed by the road.

Major intersections

See also

 List of highways numbered 204

References

External links
 

204
Las Piedras, Puerto Rico